Bo Larsson (born 13 March 1956) is a retired Swedish ice hockey player. Larsson was part of the Djurgården Swedish champions' team of 1983. Larsson made 13 Elitserien appearances for Djurgården.

References

External links

1956 births
Djurgårdens IF Hockey players
Hammarby Hockey (1921–2008) players
Living people
Swedish ice hockey goaltenders